= Michael Fitz =

Michael Fitz from the TrellisWare Technologies, Inc., San Diego, California, was named Fellow of the Institute of Electrical and Electronics Engineers (IEEE) in 2015 for contributions to the theory and practice of multiple antenna radio.
